Bruno da Silveira Mendonça (born January 7, 1984) is a Brazilian field hockey player. He competed for the Brazil men's national field hockey team at the 2016 Summer Olympics.

References

External links
 

1984 births
Living people
Brazilian male field hockey players
Olympic field hockey players of Brazil
Field hockey players at the 2016 Summer Olympics
Field hockey players at the 2015 Pan American Games
Pan American Games competitors for Brazil
Sportspeople from Rio de Janeiro (city)
Competitors at the 2022 South American Games
South American Games bronze medalists for Brazil
South American Games medalists in field hockey
21st-century Brazilian people